Ulrich Maria Seidl (born 24 November 1952 in Vienna) is an Austrian film director, writer and producer. Among other awards, his film Dog Days won the Grand Jury Prize at Venice in 2001.

His 2012 film Paradise: Love competed for the Palme d'Or at the 2012 Cannes Film Festival. The sequel Paradise: Faith won the Special Jury Prize at the 69th Venice International Film Festival. The final part of the trilogy, Paradise: Hope, premiered in competition at the 63rd Berlin International Film Festival.

Biography
Seidl grew up in a Roman Catholic family. Although at one point he wanted to become a priest, he studied journalism and drama at Vienna University instead. Afterwards, he studied film-making at the Vienna Film Academy where he produced his first short, One-Forty. Two years later he produced his first full-length film, The Ball. His 2001 film Dog Days was shot over three years during the hottest days of summer.

He is married to Veronika Franz, an Austrian filmmaker well known for her psychological horror features Goodnight Mommy (2014) and The Lodge (2019), which she both co-directed and co-wrote with their nephew Severin Fiala.

In 2005 Seidl was a member of the jury at the 27th Moscow International Film Festival. He was scheduled to attend the 2014 Jerusalem Film Festival, but cancelled his visit due to the political tension in the region.

Style
Ulrich does not consider himself a documentary filmmaker, but several of his films often blend fiction and nonfiction. Several of his films are set in his home country, Austria.

Filmography
 1980 One Forty (Einsvierzig) (short)
 1982 The Prom (Der Ball) (short)
 1990 Good News
 1992 Losses to Be Expected (Mit Verlust ist zu rechnen)
 1994 The Last Men (Die letzten Männer) (TV)
 1995 Animal Love (Tierische Liebe)
 1996 Pictures at an Exhibition (Bilder einer Ausstellung) (TV)
 1997 The Bosom Friend (Der Busenfreund) (TV)
 1998 Fun without Limits (Spass ohne Grenzen) (TV)
 1999 Models
 2001 Dog Days (Hundstage)
 2002 State of the Nation (Zur Lage)
 2003 Jesus, You Know (Jesus, Du weisst)
 2004 Our Father (Vater unser) (filmed stage play)
 2006 Brothers, Let Us Be Merry (Brüder, laßt uns lustig sein) (short)
 2007 Import/Export
 2012 Paradise trilogy (Paradies)
 Paradise: Love (Paradies: Liebe)
 Paradise: Faith (Paradies: Glaube)
 Paradise: Hope (Paradies: Hoffnung)
 2014 In the Basement (Im Keller)
 2016 Safari
 2022 Rimini
 2022 Sparta

Awards
 IDF Amsterdam Special Jury Prize - 1993 Loss Is to Be Expected
 Sarajevo Audience Award - 1999 Models
 Gijón Grand Prix Asturias - 2001 Dog Days
 Venice Silver Lion - 2001 Dog Days
 Karlovy Vary Best Feature Documentary - 2003 Jesus, You Know

References

External links
Official website

1952 births
German-language film directors
Living people
Austrian film directors
Austrian screenwriters
Austrian male screenwriters